Emma Louise Lowe was an American musician, educator, former First Lady of American Samoa and former First Lady of Guam.

Early life 
In 1902, Lowe was born in Ottumwa, Iowa.

Education 
Lowe earned a degree from Drake University Conservatory of Music in Des Moines, Iowa.

Career 
Lowe was a violinist with a musical ensemble on the Chautauqua Circuit in the Midwest. Lowe was also a pianist. Lowe became a music instructor at Eastern State Teachers College in South Dakota.

In 1953, when Richard Barrett Lowe was appointed by President Dwight D. Eisenhower as the Governor of American Samoa, Lowe became the First Ladies of American Samoa on October 1, 1953, until October 15, 1956.

In 1956, when Richard Barrett Lowe was appointed by President Dwight D. Eisenhower as the Governor of Guam, Lowe became the First Lady of Guam on October 15, 1956, until November 14, 1959.

Lowe and her husband restored old houses in Alexandria, Virginia.

Personal life 
Lowe's husband was Richard Barrett Lowe (1902-1972), an educator, Governor of American Samoa, and Governor of Guam. They had two sons, Bruce A. Lowe (1926-2015) and Cameron A. Lowe (1932-2020). Lowe and her family lived in Madison, South Dakota, Alcester, South Dakota, Wessington Springs, South Dakota, American Samoa, and Guam.

In 1953, Lowe and her family lived in America Samoa. In 1956, Lowe and her family lived Guam.

Lowe lived in a replica of George Washington's house at 508 Cameron St, Alexandria, Virginia, until 1990.

On December 27, 1995, Lowe died of cardiac arrest at the Caton Merchant House retirement facility in Manassas, Virginia. Lowe is interred at Graceland Cemetery in Madison, South Dakota.

References

External links 
 Emma Louise Lowe in the 1940 Census at ancestry.com

1902 births
1995 deaths
American violinists
American Samoan women in politics
American women musicians
First Ladies and Gentlemen of Guam
First Ladies of American Samoa
People from Alexandria, Virginia
People from Manassas, Virginia
People from Ottumwa, Iowa